Bye bye, Barbara is a 1969 French comedy film directed by Michel Deville.

Cast
 Ewa Swann as Paula
 Philippe Avron as Jerôme Thomas
 Bruno Cremer as Hugo Michelli
 Alexandra Stewart as Eve Michelli
 Michel Duchaussoy as Dimitri
 Jacques Destoop as Eterlou
 Anny Duperey as Aglaé
 Yves Brainville as Le commissaire
 Jean Eskenazi as Ménélasse

References

External links
 

1969 films
1969 comedy films
1960s French-language films
French comedy films
Films directed by Michel Deville
1960s French films